Parkway Manor is a five-story student residence hall at Portland State University in Portland, Oregon, a city in the United States. The building contains seven two-bedroom units, 24 one-bedroom units, 10 studios, and 13 sleepers that share a bath, shower, and kitchen.

History

Parkway Manor was designed by architects Bennes & Herzog in 1931 for owner and real estate developer Harry Mittleman. Mittleman had planned to begin construction sometime later, but he was pressured by the Citizens Employment Committee to hire as many workers as possible and break ground immediately as the Great Depression continued into its second year. He placed a steam shovel on the job site and began digging even before the architects had completed their design, and Mittleman created 250 jobs during construction. 

The building opened a few months later with 42 units ranging from studios to four-room apartments. Each living room contained an artificial fireplace, and ceilings were covered with "California stucco," a then-new product with colorful pigments added at the factory.

Portland State University acquired the property in 1969.

References

External links

University Housing 101
Your guide to Parkway Manor

1931 establishments in Oregon
Apartment buildings in Portland, Oregon
Buildings and structures completed in 1931
Portland State University buildings
University and college dormitories in the United States